Minority Report is a 2002 American science fiction action film directed by Steven Spielberg, loosely based on the 1956 novella "The Minority Report" by Philip K. Dick. The film is set in Washington, D.C. and Northern Virginia in the year 2054, where Precrime, a specialized police department, apprehends criminals by use of foreknowledge provided by three psychics called "precogs". The cast stars Tom Cruise as Precrime Chief John Anderton, Colin Farrell as Department of Justice agent Danny Witwer, Samantha Morton as precog Agatha Lively, and Max von Sydow as Precrime director Lamar Burgess. The film combines elements of tech noir, whodunit, thriller and science fiction genres, as well as a traditional chase film, as the main protagonist is accused of a crime he has not committed and becomes a fugitive. Spielberg characterized the story as "fifty percent character and fifty percent very complicated storytelling with layers and layers of murder mystery and plot".

The film was first optioned in 1992 as a sequel to another Dick adaptation, Total Recall (1990), with Arnold Schwarzenegger set to reprise his role as Doug Quaid. But after Total Recall production company Carolco Pictures filed for Chapter 11 bankruptcy, the project was reworked into a stand-alone project and started its development in 1997, after a script by Jon Cohen reached Spielberg and Cruise. Production suffered many delays due to Cruise's Mission: Impossible 2 and Spielberg's A.I. running over schedule, eventually starting in March 2001. During pre-production, Spielberg consulted numerous scientists in an attempt to present a more plausible future world than that seen in other science fiction films, and some of the technology designs in the film have proven prescient.

Minority Report was one of the most anticipated films of 2002 because of the high-profile collaboration between Cruise and Spielberg, as well as a surge in blockbusters in the wake of the September 11 attacks. Upon its release, the film grossed over $358 million against a production budget of $102 million, becoming 2002's tenth most-successful film worldwide. Initial reviews were generally positive. Praise was given to Cruise's performance, Spielberg's directing, action sequences, and visual effects, though some criticism was focused on the runtime and the complexity of the plot that critics felt was too difficult for audiences. It was nominated for several awards. It received an Academy Award nomination for Best Sound Editing, and eleven Saturn Award nominations, including Best Actor, Best Supporting Actor, and Saturn Award for Best Music, winning Best Science Fiction Film, Best Direction, Best Writing, and Best Supporting Actress.

Since its release, Minority Report has been critically re-evaluated and retrospective reviews have called it one of the best films for both Cruise and Spielberg and placed it among the best science fiction films of the 2000s. The film has been analyzed for its themes of free will versus determinism; the roles of preventive government in protecting its citizenry; media in a future state where technological advancements make its presence nearly boundless; the potential legality of an infallible prosecutor; and Spielberg's perennial theme of broken families. Along with several media including a video game, Minority Report was followed up by a television series of the same name in 2015, but was canceled in 2016 after one season.

Plot 

In 2054, the federal government plans to nationally implement the Washington, D.C. prototype "Precrime" police program. Three clairvoyant humans ("precogs") receive psychic impressions of an impending homicide, and officers analyze their visions to determine the crime's location and apprehend the perpetrator before the crime occurs. Would-be killers are placed in an electrically induced coma and held in a panopticon-like prison facility. Although Precrime has eliminated nearly all premeditated murders during its six-year existence, spontaneous crimes of passion called "red ball" killings (which give police an hour or less to stop the murder) still occur.

Commanding officer John Anderton joined the Precrime program after his son, Sean, was kidnapped and never found. He is depressed, addicted to a drug called "neuroin", and his wife Lara has left him. As Department of Justice agent Danny Witwer audits the Precrime operation, suspicious of flaws within the program, Agatha the female Precog grabs Anderton and mentions a phrase: "Can You See?" Anderton sees footage of a woman's murder; suspicious, he goes to the warden of the prison facility to learn more about the woman, who went missing after the attempt on her life was foiled. However, the information he seeks is missing. Soon afterward, the precogs predict that in 36 hours, Anderton will commit a premeditated murder of Leo Crow, a man whom Anderton does not recognize and has never met. Anderton flees, prompting a manhunt led by Witwer.

Anderton visits the Precrime founder, Dr. Iris Hineman, and learns that one precog occasionally sees a different future vision from the others, known as a "minority report". These discrepancies are purged from the record as group precognition agreement is the foundation of the Precrime bylaws. However, the precogs retain their memories. Anderton also discovers that early neuroin users were predisposed to having mentally disabled children; many had precognitive abilities and were tested—often fatally—and three of them form the core of Precrime.

Anderton returns to Precrime and kidnaps Agatha, described by Hineman as the most clairvoyant precog, shutting down the group-mind on which Precrime depends. Anderton and Agatha track Crow to a hotel room and find photos of children, including Sean; Anderton accuses Crow of killing Sean and nearly kills him, but relents at the last moment.  Crow then claims he was hired to plant the photos and begs Anderton to kill him, saying that his family was to be paid after his death. When Anderton still refuses, Crow kills himself in a manner similar to the precogs' vision of Anderton killing him.

With the assistance of a cybercriminal, Anderton searches Agatha's memories but fails to find a minority report for Crow's murder.  However, he discovers a memory of a murder from five years earlier. The victim was Agatha's mother, Anne Lively, the woman Anderton was looking for info on. She was a neuroin addict who sold her daughter to Precrime. After breaking her addiction, she tried to reclaim Agatha but was drowned by a hooded figure. Witwer, tipped off by Anderton, investigates the same case and learns that an attempt on Lively's life was thwarted by Precrime, but she was found dead shortly afterward. Witwer reports his findings to the Precrime director, Lamar Burgess, who kills him without being detected since the Precrime system is offline. Anderton is captured and imprisoned for the suspected murder of Crow and Witwer, and Agatha is reconnected to the system. Shortly afterwards, Lara goes to see Lamar at his office to find out more about Anne Lively, but Lamar accidentally reveals that he killed Lively. Lamar leaves a stunned Lara to attend a banquet announcing Precrime's expansion nationwide.    
 
During the  banquet, Anderton—released from prison by Lara—contacts Lamar and reveals the truth. Knowing that Precrime cannot function without Agatha, Burgess hired a neuroin addict to kill Anne Lively, and the attempt was stopped by Precrime personnel. Once they departed, Burgess killed Lively in a manner identical to the first attempt. The vision of the actual murder was deleted by technicians as a misidentified "echo". Anderton was framed by Lamar because he was about to learn the truth about Lively's murder and Lamar even used the memory of Sean's disappearance to set Anderton up as a future murderer. During the confrontation a new Precrime "red ball" report is generated, showing that Burgess will kill Anderton. Anderton confronts Burgess and describes the dilemma Burgess now faces: kill him and validate Precrime at the cost of his freedom, or spare him and see the program be discredited and shut down as the future is not predetermined. Burgess asks Anderton for forgiveness and shoots himself and dies in Anderton's arms.

Anderton and Lara reconcile, with Lara becoming pregnant with another child. Precrime is abandoned and the prisoners are pardoned and released, though many remain under police surveillance. Agatha and the twins are moved to an undisclosed location to live in peace.

Cast 

 Tom Cruise as Chief John Anderton, Precrime program commanding officer.
 Max von Sydow as Lamar Burgess, Director of Precrime.
 Colin Farrell as Danny Witwer, agent from Department of Justice.
 Samantha Morton as Agatha Lively, described as the most "talented" of the three precogs.
 Michael and Matthew Dickman as Arthur and Dashiell "Dash" Arkadin, the precog twins.
 Lois Smith as Dr. Iris Hineman, creator of precrime.
 Kathryn Morris as Lara Anderton, estranged wife of Anderton.
 Tyler Patrick Jones as Sean Anderton, John and Lara's son supposedly murdered by Crow.
 Mike Binder as Leo Crow, the precrime victim who is supposed to be killed by Anderton.
 Steve Harris as Jad Watson, agent who assists Anderton in temple.
 Jessica Harper as Anne Lively, Agatha's mother.
 Tim Blake Nelson as Gideon, a guard of the Precrime prison.
 Daniel London as Norbert "Wally" Wallace, the caretaker of the Precogs.
 Peter Stormare as Dr. Solomon P. Eddie, an underground surgeon who replaces Anderton's eyes.

The cast also features Neal McDonough as Gordon "Fletch" Fletcher and Patrick Kilpatrick as Geoffrey Knott, Precrime officers, Jessica Capshaw as Evanna, Precrime's transport pilot, Jason Antoon as Rufus T. Riley, cyber parlor proprietor; Nancy Linehan Charles as Celeste Burgess, Lamar's wife; Victor Raider-Wexler as Attorney General Arthur Nash, Arye Gross as Howard Marks, Ashley Crow as Sarah Marks, David Stifel as Lycon, Anna Maria Horsford as Casey, Joel Gretsch as Donald Dubin, Tom Choi as Nick Paymen, Caroline Lagerfelt as Greta van Eyck and William Mapother (Tom Cruise's cousin) as a hotel clerk.

Cameron Diaz, Cameron Crowe, and Paul Thomas Anderson make uncredited cameo appearances as subway passengers.

Production

Development 
Dick's story was first optioned by producer and writer Gary Goldman in 1992.  He created the initial script for the film with Ron Shusett and Robert Goethals (uncredited). It was supposed to be a sequel to the 1990 Dick adaptation Total Recall, which starred Arnold Schwarzenegger. However, Carolco Pictures, the production company that produced the film, struggled to secure either funding or Schwarzenegger's interest to progress the project before its bankruptcy in 1995. While the remake rights were purchased by Miramax Films in 1997, Shusett and Goldman had removed the Total Recall elements from their script to develop it as a standalone film, Minority Report.

Novelist Jon Cohen was hired in 1997 to adapt the story for a potential film version that would have been directed by Dutch filmmaker Jan de Bont. Meanwhile, Cruise and Spielberg, who met and became friends on the set of Cruise's film Risky Business in 1983, had been looking to collaborate for ten years. Spielberg was set to direct Cruise in Rain Man, but left to make Indiana Jones and the Last Crusade. Cruise read Cohen's script, and passed it onto Spielberg, who felt it needed some work. Spielberg was not directly involved in the writing of the script, though he was allowed to decide whether the picture's screenplay was ready to be filmed. When Cohen submitted an acceptable revision, he called Cruise and said, "Yeah, I'll do this version of the script." In that version, Witwer creates a false disk which shows Anderton killing him. When Anderton sees the clip, his belief in the infallibility of the precogs' visions convinces him it is true, therefore the precogs have a vision of him killing Witwer. At the end, Anderton shoots Witwer and one of the brother precogs finishes him off, because Witwer had slain his twin. Spielberg was attracted to the story because as both a mystery and a film set 50 years in the future, it allowed him to do "a blending of genres" which intrigued him.

In 1998, the pair joined Minority Report and announced the production as a joint venture of Spielberg's DreamWorks and Amblin Entertainment, 20th Century Fox, Cruise's Cruise/Wagner Productions, and De Bont's production company, Blue Tulip. In exchange for directing The Haunting, Spielberg offered to take over directing duties on Minority Report while De Bont was busy with post-production for Twister. Spielberg however stated that despite being credited, De Bont never became involved with the film. Cruise and Spielberg, at the latter's insistence, reportedly agreed to each take 15% of the gross instead of any money up front to try to keep the film's budget under $100 million. Spielberg said he had done the same with name actors in the past to great success: "Tom Hanks took no cash for Saving Private Ryan but he made a lot of money on his profit participation." He made this agreement a prerequisite:

Production was delayed for several years. The original plan was to begin filming after Cruise's Mission: Impossible 2 was finished, but that film ran over schedule, which also allowed Spielberg time to bring in screenwriter Scott Frank to rework Cohen's screenplay. John August did an uncredited draft to polish the script, and Frank Darabont was also invited to rewrite, but was by then busy with The Majestic. The film closely follows Scott Frank's final script (completed May 16, 2001), and contains much of Cohen's third draft (May 24, 1997). Frank removed the character of Senator Malcolm from Cohen's screenplay, and inserted Burgess, who became the "bad guy". He also rewrote Witwer from a villain to a "good guy", as he was in the short story. In contrast to Spielberg's next science fiction picture, War of the Worlds, which he called "100 percent character" driven, Spielberg said the story for Minority Report became "50 percent character and 50 percent very complicated storytelling with layers and layers of murder mystery and plot." According to film scholar Warren Buckland, Cohen and Frank apparently did not see the Goldman and Schusett screenplay, but instead worked on their own adaptation. Goldman and Schusett, however, claimed the pair used a lot of material from their script, so the issue went through the Writer's Guild arbitration process. They won a partial victory; they were not given writing credits, but were listed as executive producers. The film was delayed again so Spielberg could finish A.I. after the death of his friend Stanley Kubrick. When Spielberg originally signed on to direct, he planned to have an entirely different supporting cast. He offered the role of Witwer to Matt Damon, Iris Hineman to Meryl Streep, Burgess to Ian McKellen, Agatha to Cate Blanchett, and Lara to Jenna Elfman. Streep declined the role, Damon opted out, and the other roles were recast due to the delays. Spielberg also offered the role of Witwer to Javier Bardem, who turned it down.

Technology 

After E.T., Spielberg started to consult experts, and put more scientific research into his science fiction films. In 1999, he invited fifteen experts convened by Peter Schwartz and Stewart Brand to a hotel in Santa Monica for a three-day "think tank". He wanted to consult with the group to create a plausible "future reality" for the year 2054 as opposed to a more traditional "science fiction" setting. Dubbed the "think tank summit", the experts included architect Peter Calthorpe, author Douglas Coupland, urbanist and journalist Joel Garreau, computer scientist Neil Gershenfeld, biomedical researcher Shaun Jones, computer scientist Jaron Lanier, and former Massachusetts Institute of Technology (MIT) architecture dean William J. Mitchell. Production designer Alex McDowell kept what was nicknamed the "2054 bible", an 80-page guide created in preproduction which listed all the aspects of the future world: architectural, socio-economic, political, and technological. While the discussions did not change key elements in the film, they were influential in the creation of some of the more utopian aspects, though John Underkoffler, the science and technology advisor for the film, described it as "much grayer and more ambiguous" than what was envisioned in 1999. Underkoffler, who designed most of Anderton's interface after Spielberg told him to make it "like conducting an orchestra", said "it would be hard to identify anything [in the movie] that had no grounding in reality." McDowell teamed up with architect Greg Lynn to work on some of the technical aspects of the production design. Lynn praised his work, saying that a "lot of those things Alex cooked up for Minority Report, like the 3-D screens, have become real."

Spielberg described his ideas for the film's technology to Roger Ebert before its release:

Filming 

Minority Report was the first film to have an entirely digital production design. Termed "previz", as an abbreviation of previsualization (a term borrowed from the film's narrative), production designer Alex McDowell said the system allowed them to use Photoshop in place of painters, and employ 3D animation programs (Maya and XSI) to create a simulated set, which could be filled with digital actors then used to block out shots in advance. The technology also allowed the tie-in video game and special effects companies to cull data from the previous system before the film was finished, which they used to establish parameters for their visuals. When Spielberg quickly became a fan, McDowell said "It became pretty clear that [he] wouldn't read an illustration as a finished piece, but if you did it in Photoshop and created a photorealistic environment he focused differently on it." Minority Report was the last live-action visual effects job for PDI/DreamWorks which became DreamWorks Animation shortly afterwards. PDI/DreamWorks primarily worked on the Spyder sequences and visual effects supervisor Henry LaBounta took inspiration from deep sea jellyfish: "Their tentacles have these bioluminescent little lights that kind of run through their tentacles and that just looks so cool. So I got back to the studio and talked to the artists and I said, ‘We’re gonna do some radiating jellyfish bioluminescent lights on the bottom of this spider, and try that.’"

Filming took place from March 22 to July 18, 2001, in Washington, D.C., Virginia, and Los Angeles. Film locations included the Ronald Reagan Building (as PreCrime headquarters) and Georgetown. The skyline of Rosslyn, Virginia is visible when Anderton flies across the Potomac River. A quick shot of Indian Field Creek, which crosses the Colonial Parkway in Yorktown, Virginia, is seen as John takes Agatha to his wife's house. During production, Spielberg made regular appearances on a video-only webcam based in the craft services truck, both alone and with Tom Cruise; together they conferred publicly with Ron Howard and Russell Crowe via a similar webcam on the set of A Beautiful Mind in New York.

The location of the small, uncharted island in the last shot of the film is Butter Island off North Haven, Maine in the Penobscot Bay.

Although it takes place in an imagined future world of advanced technology, Minority Report attempts to embody a more "realistic" depiction of the future. Spielberg decided that to be more credible, the setting had to keep both elements of the present and ones which specialists expected would be forthcoming. Thus Washington, D.C. as depicted in the movie keeps well-known buildings such as the Capitol and the Washington Monument, as well as a section of modern buildings on the other side of the Potomac River. Production designer Alex McDowell was hired based on his work in Fight Club and his storyboards for a film version of Fahrenheit 451 which would have starred Mel Gibson. McDowell studied modern architecture, and his sets contain many curves, circular shapes, and reflective materials. Costume designer Deborah L. Scott decided to make the clothes worn by the characters as simple as possible, so as not to make the depiction of the future seem dated.

The stunt crew was the same one used in Cruise's Mission: Impossible 2, and was responsible for complex action scenes. These included the auto factory chase scene, filmed in a real facility using props such as a welding robot, and the fight between Anderton and the jetpack-clad officers, filmed in an alley set built on the Warner Bros. studio lot. Industrial Light & Magic did most of the special effects, while PDI/DreamWorks was responsible for the Spyder robots. The company Pixel Liberation Front did previsualization animatics. The holographic projections and the prison facility were filmed by several roving cameras which surrounded the actors, and the scene where Anderton gets off his car and runs along the Maglev vehicles was filmed on stationary props, which were later replaced by computer-generated vehicles.

Storyline differences 

Like most film adaptations of Dick's works, many aspects of his story were changed in their transition to film, such as the addition of Lamar Burgess and the change in setting from New York City to Washington, D.C., Baltimore, and Northern Virginia. The character of John Anderton was changed from a balding and out-of-shape old man to an athletic officer in his 40s to fit its portrayer and the film's action scenes. The film adds two stories of tragic families; Anderton's, and that of the three pre-cogs. In the short story, Anderton is married with no children, while in the film, he is the divorced father of a kidnapped son, who is most likely deceased. Although it is implied, but unclear in the film whether Agatha is related to the twin pre-cogs, her family was shattered when Burgess murdered her mother, Anne Lively. The precogs were intellectually disabled and deformed individuals in the story, but in the film, they are the genetically mutated offspring of drug addicts. Anderton's future murder and the reasons for the conspiracy were changed from a general who wants to discredit PreCrime to regain some military funding, to a man who murdered a precog's mother to preserve PreCrime. The subsequent murders and plot developed from this change. The film's ending also differs from the short story's. In Dick's story, Anderton prevents the closure of the PreCrime division, however, in the movie Anderton successfully brings about the end of the organization. Other aspects were updated to include current technology. For instance in the story, Anderton uses a punch card machine to interpret the precogs' visions; in the movie, he uses a virtual reality interface.

Themes 

The main theme of Minority Report is the classic philosophical debate of free will versus determinism. Other themes explored by the film include involuntary commitment, the nature of political and legal systems in a high technology-advanced society, the rights of privacy in a media-dominated world, and the nature of self-perception. The film also continues to follow Spielberg's tradition of depicting broken families, which he has said is motivated by his parents' divorce when he was a child.

Music 

The score was composed by regular Spielberg collaborator John Williams, who inspired Bernard Herrmann's musical work in the film; Instead of focusing on the science fiction elements, he made a score suitable for the film noir, including the use of female singer in the some sequences, and emotional themes, which Williams considered unusual for that genre. Several classical pieces, including Franz Schubert's Symphony No. 8 (Unfinished Symphony), Haydn string quartet (Op. 64, No. 1), Tchaikovsky's Symphony No. 6 (Pathétique), were implemented in the score, though Williams said that the choices of using classical pieces were made by the studio.

Besides composing, Williams conducted the score, with orchestration by John Neufeld and vocals by Deborah Dietrich. The music was released on June 18, 2002 by DreamWorks Records in CD, vinyl and cassettes, and re-issued by Geffen Records in mid-2014 for streaming media and download. The full score as heard in the film, was released into a 2-disc "expanded edition" in 2019, which was marketed by La-La Land Records, along with several alternate and unused tracks as bonus material.

Style 
[[Image:Minority Report bleached.jpg|thumb|Minority Report'''s unique visual style: It was overlit, and the negatives were bleach-bypassed in post-production to desaturate the colors in the film.|alt=Two men, one of whom is wearing futuristic armor and helmet. A distinctive blue tint colours the image.]]Minority Report is a futuristic film which portrays elements of a both dystopian and utopian future. The film renders a much more detailed view of its future world than the book and contains new technologies not in Dick's story. From a stylistic standpoint, Minority Report resembles Spielberg's previous film A.I., but also incorporates elements of film noir. Spielberg said that he "wanted to give the movie a noir feel. So I threw myself a film festival. Asphalt Jungle. Key Largo. The Maltese Falcon." The picture was deliberately overlit, and the negative was bleach-bypassed during post-production. The scene in which Anderton is dreaming about his son's kidnapping at the pool is the only one shot in "normal" color. Bleach-bypassing gave the film a distinctive look; it desaturated the film's colors, to the point that it nearly resembles a black-and-white movie, yet the blacks and shadows have a high contrast like a film noir picture.Vest. p. 128 The color was reduced by "about 40%" to achieve the "washed-out" appearance. Elvis Mitchell, formerly of The New York Times, commented that "The picture looks as if it were shot on chrome, caught on the fleeing bumper of a late '70s car."

Spielberg preferred film to the then-emerging digital video format, and opted to create the film's look photochemically. Cinematographer Janusz Kamiński shot the film with high-speed film in Super 35 format (which requires an additional enlarging process) to increase the overall grain, having been told by Spielberg to create "the ugliest, dirtiest movie" he'd ever shot. The film's camera work is very mobile, alternating between handheld and Steadicam shots, which are "exaggerated by the use of wide angle lenses and the occasional low camera angle" to increase the perception of movement according to film scholar Warren Buckland. Kamiński said that he never used a lens longer than 27mm, and alternated between 17, 21, and 27mm lenses, as Spielberg liked to "keep the actors as close to the camera as possible". He also said, "We staged a lot of scenes in wide shots that have a lot of things happening with the frame." The duo also used several long takes to focus on the emotions of the actors, rather than employing numerous cuts. Spielberg eschewed the typical "shot reverse shot" cinematography technique used when filming characters' interactions in favor of the long takes, which were shot by a mobile, probing camera. McDowell relied on colorless chrome and glass objects of curved and circular shapes in his set designs, which, aided by the "low-key contrastive lighting", populated the film with shadows, creating a "futuristic film noir atmosphere".

Buckland describes the film's 14 minute opening sequence as the "most abstract and complex of any Spielberg film." The first scene is a distorted precog vision of a murder, presented out of context. The pace of the film is sped up, slowed, and even reversed, and the movie "jumps about in time and space" by intercutting the images in no discernible order. When it ends, it becomes clear that the scene was presented through Agatha's eyes, and that this is how previsions appear to her. Fellow scholar Nigel Morris called this scene a "trailer", because it foreshadows the plot and establishes the type of "tone, generic expectations, and enigmas" that will be used in the film. The visions of the pre-cogs are presented in a fragmented series of clips using a "squishy lens" device, which distorts the images, blurring their edges and creating ripples across them. They were created by a two-man production team, hired by Spielberg, who chose the "layered, dreamlike imagery" based on some comments from cognitive psychologists the pair consulted. In the opening's next scene, Anderton is "scrubbing the images", by standing like a composer (as Spielberg terms it), and manipulating them, while Jad assists him. Next the family involved in the murder in Agatha's vision is shown interacting, which establishes that the opening scene was a prevision. The picture then cuts back to Anderton and the precogs' images, before alternating between the three. The opening is self-contained, and according to Buckland acts merely as a setup for numerous elements of the story. It lasts 14 minutes, includes 171 shots, and has an average shot length of five seconds as opposed to the 6.5 second average for the entire film. The opening's five-second average is attained despite "very fast cutting" in the beginning and ending, because the middle has longer takes, which reach 20 seconds in some instances. Spielberg also continues his tradition of "heavily diffused backlighting" for much of the interior shots.

 Release 

 Context 
The summer of 2002 was expected to be competitive at the global box office due to the high number of franchises, blockbusters, and star-studded projects. Many of the films released were expected to provide escapism for Americans in the aftermath of the September 11 attacks that occurred in New York City in 2001.

Spielberg typically keeps the plot points of his films closely guarded before their release, and Minority Report was no different. He said he had to remove some scenes, and a few "F-words" to get the film's PG-13 rating. Following the disappointing box office results of Spielberg's A.I., the marketing campaign for Minority Report downplayed his role in the movie and sold the film as a Cruise action thriller.

Tom Rothman, chairman of the film's co-financier Fox Filmed Entertainment, described the film's marketing strategy thus: "How are we marketing it? It's Cruise and Spielberg. What else do we need to do?" The strategy made sense; coming into the film, Spielberg had made 20 films which grossed a domestic total of $2.8 billion, while Cruise's resume featured 23 films and $2 billion in domestic revenues. With their combined 30% take of the film's box office though, sources such as BusinessWeek's Ron Grover predicted the studios would have a hard time making the money needed to break even. Despite the outward optimism, as a more adult-oriented, darker film than typical blockbusters, the studio held different box office expectations for the film than they would a more family friendly film. Entertainment Weekly projected the film would gross $40 million in the US in its opening weekend, and Variety predicted that the high concept storyline would not appeal to children and would render it a "commercial extra-base hit rather than a home run."

 Theatrical run 
The world premiere of Minority Report took place in New York City on June 19, 2002. An online "popcorn cam" broadcast live from inside the premiere. Cruise attended the London premiere the following week, and mingled with thousands of adoring fans as he walked through the city's Leicester Square. It debuted at first place in the U.S. box office, collecting $35.677 million in its opening weekend, ahead of Lilo & Stitch. Forbes considered those numbers below expectations, as they gave the film a small edge over Lilo & Stitch, which debuted in second place ($35.260 million). Lilo & Stitch sold more tickets, but since much of the film's attendees were children, its average ticket price was much lower. The film opened at the top of the box office in numerous foreign markets; it made $6.7 million in 780 locations in Germany its opening weekend, and accounted for 35% of France's total box office weekend office gross when it collected $5 million in 700 theaters. In Great Britain, Minority Report made $36.9 million in its first three days. It went on to make $5.9 million in the UK, ranking number one at the box office, beating Spider-Man. Minority Report had the country's third-highest opening for a Steven Spielberg film, behind Jurassic Park and its successor The Lost World: Jurassic Park. The film then made $6.2 million in Italy in its first ten, $815,000 in its 75 location opening weekend in Belgium, and $405,000 in an 80 theater opening weekend in Switzerland. Meanwhile, in Turkey, it made $307,822 from 64 screens, achieving the third-highest opening for any 20th Century Fox film in the country, after Star Wars: Episode I – The Phantom Menace and Titanic. The BBC felt the film's UK performance was "buoyed by Cruise's charm offensive at last week's London premiere." Minority Report made a total of $132 million in the United States and $226.3 million overseas.

 Home media 
DreamWorks spent several million dollars marketing the film's DVD and VHS releases. The campaign included a tie-in video game released by Activision, which contained a trailer for the movie's DVD. Minority Report was successful in the home video market, selling at least four million DVDs in its first few months of release. The DVD took two years to produce. For the first time, Spielberg allowed filmmakers to shoot footage on the set of one of his films. Premiere-award-winning DVD producer Laurent Bouzereau, who would become a frequent Spielberg DVD collaborator, shot hundreds of hours of the film's production in the then-new high-definition video format. It contained over an hour of featurettes which discussed various aspects of film production, included breakdowns of the film's stunt sequences, and new interviews with Spielberg, Cruise, and other "Academy Award-winning filmmakers". The film was released on a two-disc Blu-ray by Paramount Pictures (now the owner of the early DreamWorks library) on May 16, 2010. It included exclusive extras and interactive features, such as a new Spielberg interview, that were not included in the DVD edition. The film was transferred from its "HD master" which retained the distinctive grainy appearance.

 Video game 
A video game based on the film titled Minority Report: Everybody Runs was developed by Treyarch, published by Activision and released on November 18, 2002, for Game Boy Advance, GameCube, PlayStation 2, and Xbox. It received mixed reviews.

 Reception 
On the review aggregator Rotten Tomatoes, Minority Report received 90% positive reviews based on 254 critics and an average rating of 8.20/10. The site's critical consensus is, "Thought-provoking and visceral, Steven Spielberg successfully combines high concept ideas and high octane action in this fast and febrile sci-fi thriller." The website listed it among the best reviewed films of 2002. The film also earned an 80 out of a possible 100 on the similar review aggregating website Metacritic based on 37 reviews, indicating "generally favorable reviews". Audiences polled by CinemaScore gave the film an average grade of "B+" on an A+ to F scale.

Most critics gave the film's handling of its central theme (free will vs. determinism) positive reviews, and many ranked it as the film's main strength. Other reviewers felt that Spielberg did not adequately tackle the issues he raised. The film has inspired discussion and analysis, the scope of which has been compared to the continuing analysis of Blade Runner. This discussion has advanced past the realm of standard film criticism. Slovenian philosopher Slavoj Žižek fashioned a criticism of the Cheney Doctrine by comparing its preemptive strike methodology to that of the film's PreCrime system.

Richard Corliss of Time said it's "Spielberg's sharpest, brawniest, most bustling entertainment since Raiders of the Lost Ark". Mike Clark of USA Today felt it succeeded due to a "breathless 140-minute pace with a no-flab script packed with all kinds of surprises." Lisa Schwarzbaum of Entertainment Weekly praised the film's visuals, and Todd McCarthy of Variety complimented the cast's performances. Film scholar Warren Buckland recommended the film, but felt that the comedic elements—aside from Stormare's lines—detracted from the plot and undermined the film's credibility.

Several critics used their reviews to discuss Spielberg and analyze what the film signified in his development as a filmmaker. Andrew O'Hehir of the online magazine Salon expressed excitement over the atypically hard edge of the movie. "Little Steven Spielberg is all grown up now ... into of all things a superior film artist ... It's too early to know whether Minority Report, on the heels of A.I., marks a brief detour in Spielberg's career or a permanent change of course, but either way it's a dark and dazzling spectacle." J. Hoberman of The Village Voice said it is "the most entertaining, least pretentious genre movie Steven Spielberg has made in the decade since Jurassic Park." Randy Shulman of Metro Weekly said that "the movie is a huge leap forward for the director, who moves once and for all into the world of adult movie making." Roger Ebert called the film a "masterpiece" and said that when most directors of the period were putting "their trust in technology", Spielberg had already mastered it, and was emphasizing "story and character" while merely using technology as a "workman uses his tools". Ebert eventually named the film the best film of the year. David Edelstein of Slate echoed the positive sentiments, saying "It has been a long time since a Spielberg film felt so nimble, so unfettered, so free of self-cannibalizing." Jonathan Rosenbaum, then of the Chicago Reader, was less convinced. Though he approved of the film, he derided it in his review as a superficial action film, cautioning audiences to enjoy the movie but not "be conned into thinking that some sort of serious, thoughtful statement is being delivered along with the roller-coaster ride."

Andrew Sarris of the New York Observer gave the film a negative review in which he described the script as full of plot holes, the car chases as silly, and criticized the mixture of futuristic environments with "defiantly retro costuming". The complexity of the storyline was also a source of criticism for Kenneth Turan of the Los Angeles Times, who considered the plot "too intricate and difficult to follow". Rosenbaum and Hoberman both referred to the titular minority report as a "red herring". More positive reviews have seen it similarly, but referred to it as a "MacGuffin".

 Awards and honors 
The film earned nominations for many awards, including Best Sound Editing at the 75th Academy Awards (lost to The Lord of the Rings: The Two Towers), and Best Visual Effects at the BAFTAs. It was nominated for eleven Saturn Awards including Best Actor for Cruise, Best Supporting Actor for von Sydow and Best Music for Williams, and won four: Best Science Fiction Film, Best Direction for Spielberg, Best Writing for Frank and Cohen and Supporting Actress for Morton. It was nominated for two Visual Effects Society Awards in the categories of "Best Effects Art Direction in a Motion Picture" and "Best Compositing in a Motion Picture". It also won the BMI Film Music Award, the Online Film Critics Society Award for Best Supporting Actress, and the Empire Awards for Best Actor for Cruise, Best Director for Spielberg and Best British Actress for Morton. Ebert listed Minority Report as the best film of 2002, as did online film reviewer James Berardinelli. The film was also included in top ten lists by critic Richard Roeper, and both reviewers at USA Today.

In 2008, the American Film Institute nominated this film for its Top 10 Science Fiction Films list. Roger Ebert eventually called it one of his favorite films of the 2000s. Likewise, The Washington Post picked Minority Report'' as one of the 23 best films from 2000 to 2018.

Television series

On September 9, 2014, it was announced that a follow-up television series had been given a pilot commitment at Fox. Max Borenstein wrote the script and served as executive producer alongside Spielberg, Justin Falvey and Darryl Frank. The series was envisioned to be set 10 years after the film, and focused on a male precog who teams up with a female detective to find a purpose to his gift. On February 13, 2015, Daniel London and Li Jun Li joined the cast. On February 24, 2015, Laura Regan was cast as Agatha Lively, replacing Samantha Morton, who was said to have been offered to reprise the role. In March 2015, Stark Sands and Meagan Good landed the lead roles with Sands playing the role of Dash, one of the male precogs, and Good playing Lara Vega, a detective haunted by her past, who works with Dash to help him find a purpose for his gift, Li Jun Li plays Akeela, a CSI technician, Daniel London reprised his role as Wally the Caretaker from the original film and Wilmer Valderrama was cast as a police detective. The show was picked up to series by Fox on May 9, 2015, and made its broadcast debut on September 21, 2015, but was cancelled on May 13, 2016.

See also 
Causal loop
Inchoate offense
List of films featuring surveillance

Notes

References

Bibliography

External links 

 
 
 
 
 
 
 

 
2002 films
2002 action thriller films
2002 science fiction action films
2000s chase films
2000s dystopian films
20th Century Fox films
Alternate timeline films
Amblin Entertainment films
American action thriller films
American dystopian films
American neo-noir films
American science fiction action films
American science fiction thriller films
Cruise/Wagner Productions films
DreamWorks Pictures films
Films about advertising
Films about altered memories
Films about memory
Films about precognition
Films about security and surveillance
Films adapted into television shows
Films based on science fiction short stories
Films based on works by Philip K. Dick
Films directed by Steven Spielberg
Films produced by Bonnie Curtis
Films produced by Gerald R. Molen
Films produced by Walter F. Parkes
Films set in 2054
Films set in Virginia
Films set in Washington, D.C.
Films shot in Los Angeles
Films shot in Virginia
Films shot in Washington, D.C.
Films scored by John Williams
Films with screenplays by Scott Frank
2000s English-language films
20th Century Studios franchises
Paramount Pictures franchises
2000s American films